The 1975 All-Big Ten Conference football team consists of American football players chosen by various organizations for All-Big Ten Conference teams for the 1975 Big Ten Conference football season.

Offensive selections

Quarterbacks
 Cornelius Greene, Ohio State (AP-1; UPI-1)
 Tony Dungy, Minnesota (UPI-2)

Running backs
 Gordon Bell, Michigan (AP-1; UPI-1)
 Archie Griffin, Ohio State (AP-1; UPI-1)
 Billy Marek, Wisconsin (AP-1; UPI-2)
 Pete Johnson, Ohio State (UPI-1)
 Mike Pruitt, Purdue (UPI-2)
 Courtney Snyder, Indiana (UPI-2)

Wide receivers
 Jim Smith, Michigan (AP-1; UPI-1)
 Scott Yelvington, Northwestern (UPI-2)

Tight ends
 Joe Smalzer, Illinois (AP-1)
 Mike Cobb, Michigan State (UPI-1)
 Brandt Yocum, Iowa (UPI-2)

Centers
 Paul Jasinskis, Northwestern (AP-1; UPI-2)
 Jim Czirr, Michigan (UPI-1)

Guards
 Terry Stieve, Wisconsin (AP-1; UPI-1)
 Ted Smith, Ohio State (AP-1; UPI-2)
 Joe Devlin, Iowa (UPI-1)
 Mark Donahue, Michigan (UPI-2)

Tackles
 Scott Dannelley, Ohio State (AP-1; UPI-2)
 Rod Walter, Iowa (AP-1)
 Dennis Lick, Wisconsin (UPI-1)
 Chris Ward, Ohio State (UPI-1)
 Ken Long, Purdue (UPI-2)

Defensive selections

Defensive ends
 Dan Jilek, Michigan (AP-1; UPI-1)
 Bob Brudzinski, Ohio State (UPI-1)
 Pat Curto, Ohio State (UPI-2)
 Dennis Stejskal, Wisconsin (UPI-2)

Defensive tackles
 Nick Buonamici, Ohio State (AP-1; UPI-1)
 Keith Simons, Minnesota (AP-1; UPI-2)
 Greg Morton, Michigan (UPI-1)
 Greg Schaum, Ohio State (UPI-2)

Nose guards
 Tim Davis, Michigan (AP-1; UPI-1)
 Aaron Brown, Ohio State (UPI-2)

Linebackers
 Donnie Thomas, Indiana (AP-1; UPI-1)
 Ed Thompson, Ohio State (AP-1; UPI-2)
 Blane Smith, Purdue (AP-1)
 Calvin O'Neal, Michigan (UPI-1)
 Andre Jackson, Iowa (UPI-2)

Defensive backs
 Don Dufek, Michigan (AP-1 [linebacker]; UPI-1)
 Tim Fox, Ohio State (AP-1; UPI-1)
 Tom Hannon, Michigan State (AP-1; UPI-1)
 Pete Shaw, Northwestern (AP-1; UPI-1)
 Bruce Beaman, Illinois (UPI-2)
 Doug Beaudoin, Minnesota (UPI-2)
 Craig Cassady, Ohio State (UPI-2)
 Jim Pickens, Michigan (UPI-2)

Special teams

Placekicker
 Dan Beaver, Illinois (AP-1; UPI-1)

Punter
 Tom Skladany, Ohio State (AP-1; UPI-1)

Key
AP = Associated Press, selected by a panel of sportswriters and broadcasters from throughout the Midwest

UPI = United Press International, as chosen by the Big Ten coaches for the UPI

Bold = Consensus first-team selection of the AP and UPI

See also
1975 College Football All-America Team

References

All-Big Ten Conference
All-Big Ten Conference football teams